"Think of You" is a song recorded by Italian Eurodance project Whigfield, which was performed by Danish-born Sannie Charlotte Carlson. It was released in May 1995 as the third single from her first album, Whigfield (1995), and scored success on the charts in Europe. The single reached number seven in the UK and was a top 10 hit also in Canada, Denmark, Iceland, Ireland, Italy, Lithuania, the Netherlands, Spain and Zimbabwe. On the Eurochart Hot 100, "Think of You" reached number four.

The song became quite notorious in the UK due to the lyrical content of the extended version which featured the line "I need you inside me tonight" — this was changed to "I need you beside me tonight" for the radio & video release.

Chart performance
Like "Saturday Night" and its follow-up single "Another Day", "Think of You" was successful on the charts in Europe. It was a top 5 hit in Denmark (4), Ireland (4), Italy (4), Scotland (4) and Spain, where the single reached its best chart position as number three. Additionally, it also reached the top 10 in Iceland (9), Lithuania, the Netherlands (6) and the United Kingdom. In the latter, it peaked at number seven in its third week on the UK Singles Chart on 11 June 1995. A moderate hit in UK clubs, it reached number 18 on the UK Dance Singles Chart, while peaking at number 24 on the Music Week Club Chart. And on the Music Week UK on a Pop Tip Club Chart, it fared even better, reaching number four. On both the Eurochart Hot 100 and MTV European Top 20, "Think of You" hit number four. Outside Europe, the song charted in Canada, where it peaked at number three on The Record singles chart, number 66 on the RPM Top Singles chart and number two on the RPM Dance/Urban chart. On the African continent, it was successful in Zimbabwe, reaching number four.

Critical reception
AllMusic editor William Cooper described the song as "irresistibly catchy". Mark Dezzani from Billboard labeled it as "tart-pop", "rather than pop-tart", viewing it as "equally catchy" as "Another Day". Chris Heath from The Daily Telegraph named it "her greatest song" and the "summer's most uplifting single". In his weekly UK chart commentary, James Masterton found that "Think of You" "moves more than ever towards being a straightforward narrative song and possibly loses even more of the charm of her first smash hit." Pan-European magazine Music & Media felt that "the Dancing Divaz club mix serves this Euro track right especially well, as it highlights the nerve-wrecking synth riff and the one-line chorus in a most hypnotising way." A reviewer from Music Week gave it four out of five, writing, "Infectious, uncomplicated and guaranteed to complete a hat-trick of hits for the lyrically-challenged Dane. She has to resort to her cutesy diddly-doos towards the end but the happy vibe lasts the full four minutes." James Hamilton from the RM Dance Update called it a "typically sing-song but quite suggestively worded cheerful shrill pop romp".

Music video
In the accompanying music video for "Think of You", Whigfield plays a director, performing at a movie set. She is dressed in a red suit and her hair is darker than in her previous music videos. She directs and several workers are carrying and placing white pillars and statues around on the set. Sometimes Whigfield sings, while sitting in the director chair, other times she sits on a movie crane. Towards the end, everyone leaves the set, while Whigfield is left alone, singing while she is walking in between the pillars. The video was later published on YouTube in March 2013, and had generated almost three million views as of January 2023.

Track listing

 7" single, Germany
 "Think of You" (Radio Edit) — 4:16
 "Think of You" (M.B.R.G. Remix) — 4:34

 12", Italy
 "Think of You" (Extended Version) — 5:20
 "Think of You" (M.B.R.G. Remix) — 4:31
 "Think of You" (David Club Mix) — 5:49
 "Think of You" (Dancing Divaz Club Mix) — 7:38

 CD single, UK & Europe
 "Think of You" (Radio Edit) — 4:03
 "Think of You" (David Remix) — 5:51
 "Think of You" (Extended X UK) — 5:21
 "Think of You" (Dancing Divaz Club Mix) — 7:39
 "Think of You" (MBRG Remix) — 4:31

 CD maxi, Canada
 "Think of You" (Extended Mix) — 5:26
 "Think of You" (MBRG Remix) — 4:37
 "Think of You" (David Remix) — 5:55
 "Think of You" (Radio Version) — 4:19
 "Think of You" (Dancing Divaz Club Mix) — 7:39

 CD maxi, Denmark
 "Think of You" (Radio Version) — 4:15
 "Think of You" (Extended) — 5:20
 "Think of You" (David Remix) — 5:49
 "Think of You" (Dancing Divaz Remix) — 7:38

 CD maxi, Germany
 "Think of You" (Radio Edit) — 4:16
 "Think of You  (Extended Version) — 5:23
 "Think of You" (MBRG Remix) — 4:34
 "Think of You" (David Club Mix) — 5:51
 "Think of You" (Dancing Divaz Club Mix) — 7:39

 CD maxi, Netherlands
 "Think of You" (Radio Version) — 4:15
 "Think of You" (Extended Version) — 5:20
 "Think of You" (MBRG Remix) — 4:31
 "Think of You" (David Remix) — 5:49
 "Think of You" (Dancing Divaz Club Mix) — 7:38

 CD maxi, UK
 "Think of You" (Radio Edit)
 "Think of You" (David Remix)
 "Think of You" (Extended X UK)
 "Think of You" (Dancing Divaz Club Mix)
 "Think of You" (MBRG Remix)

 EP – Australia
 "Think of You" (Radio Edit)
 "Think of You" (David Club Mix)
 "Think of You" (MBRG Remix)
 "Think of You" (Dancing Divaz Club Mix)
 "Think of You" (Extended Version)
 "Think of You" (DMC Remix)

Remixes
In 2007, Whigfield released her first single in three years, a re-release of the original from 1995, which was reworked and updated with new sounds. The single was available in two formats, "Think of You" (Banana Mixes) and "Think of You" (Pineapple Mixes). However, in Italy the two formats are all on one release.

Pineapple mixes
 "Think of You" (Gabry Ponte Remix) — 5:55
 "Think of You" (Gabry Ponte Remix Instrumental) — 6:01
 "Think of You" (Gabry Ponte Remix Radio Edit) — 2:55
 "Think of You" (Original Album Mix) — 3:34
 "Think of You" (Mathieu Bouthier & Muttonheads Remix) — 5:16
 "Think of You" (Mathieu Bouthier & Muttonheads Remix Instrumental) — 5:41		
 "Think of You" (Mathieu Bouthier & Muttonheads Remix Radio Edit) — 3:23

Banana mixes
 "Think of You" (SunLoverz Big Room Remix) — 6:04
 "Think of You" (SunLoverz Big Room Remix Instrumental) — 6:04
 "Think of You" (SunLoverz Big Room Remix Radio Edit) — 3:13
 "Think of You" (F&A Factor Remix Extended) — 6:14
 "Think of You" (F&A Factor Remix Instrumental Radio) — 2:59
 "Think of You" (F&A Factor Remix Radio Edit) — 2:59
 "Think of You" (Yan vs. Favretto Remix) — 5:50
 "Think of You" (Yan vs. Favretto Remix Instrumental) — 5:50

Charts

Weekly charts

Year-end charts

References

1995 singles
1995 songs
English-language Italian songs
Songs written by Ann Lee (singer)
Songs written by Larry Pignagnoli
Whigfield songs